The Water of Girvan (or River Girvan) is a river in South Ayrshire, which has its source at Loch Girvan Eye in the Carrick Forest section of Galloway Forest Park. This  river passes through the villages of Straiton, Crosshill and Dailly en route to the Firth of Clyde at Girvan Harbour.

Girvan